Carytius of Pergamum was an ancient Greek grammarian who lived at the end of the 2nd century BCE, all of whose works are now lost. Among his works were Historical Notes (Ἱστορικα ὑπομνήματα), On the Dramatic Poets (Περι διδασκαλιῶν), and On Sotades (Περι Σωτάδου).  The first of these was used by Athenaeus in composing the Deipnosophistae, in which many of its passages are preserved.

External links
Entry in Smith, Dictionary of Greek and Roman Biography of Mythology

Ancient Greek grammarians
People from Pergamon
2nd-century BC Greek people
2nd-century BC writers